Richard Tucker (August 28, 1913January 8, 1975) was an American operatic tenor and cantor. Long associated with the Metropolitan Opera, Tucker's career was primarily centered in the United States.

Early life 
Tucker was born Rivn (Rubin) Ticker in Brooklyn, New York, the son of Bessarabian Jewish  parents who immigrated to the US in 1911. His father, Sruel (Sam) Ticker, and mother Fanya-Tsipa (Fanny) Ticker had already adopted the surname "Tucker" by the time their son entered first grade. His musical aptitude was discovered early, and was nurtured under the tutelage of Samuel Weisser at the Tifereth Israel synagogue in Lower Manhattan. As a teenager, Tucker's interests alternated between athletics, at which he excelled during his high-school years, and singing for weddings and bar mitzvahs as a cantorial student. Eventually, he progressed from a part-time cantor at Temple Emanuel in Passaic, New Jersey, to full-time cantorships at Temple Adath Israel in the Bronx and, in June 1943, at the large and prestigious Brooklyn Jewish Center. Until then, Tucker's income derived mainly from his weekly commissions as a salesman for the Reliable Silk Company in Manhattan's garment district.

On February 11, 1936, Tucker married Sara Perelmuth, the youngest child (and only daughter) of Levi and Anna Perelmuth, proprietors of the Grand Mansion, a kosher banquet hall in Manhattan's Lower East Side. At the time of Tucker's wedding to their daughter, the Perelmuths' musically gifted eldest son, Yakob, had progressed from a part-time jazz violinist and lyric tenor vocalist to a national radio star who had already set his sights on an operatic career. Under the management of Sol Hurok, the eldest of the Perelmuth offspring, now renamed Jan Peerce, reached his goal when the general manager of the Metropolitan Opera Company, Edward Johnson, offered him a contract after an impressive audition. When Peerce made his much-acclaimed debut at the Met on November 29, 1941, his sister and her new husband were living with Peerce's parents.

Operatic career 
Although Peerce remained skeptical of Tucker's singing talent and did not overtly encourage his operatic ambitions (causing an unfortunate rift between the two brothers-in-law and their families, which apparently never completely healed), Peerce did play a role in introducing Tucker to conductor and arranger Zavel Zilberts, who coached Tucker until he came to the attention of Paul Althouse, a notable tenor whose operatic career had begun during Enrico Caruso's reigning years at the Met. Althouse became Tucker's only teacher. Contrary to his teacher's advice, Tucker entered the Metropolitan Opera "Auditions of the Air" in 1943, but did not win. When Met general manager Edward Johnson came unannounced to the Brooklyn Jewish Center to hear Tucker sing, however, Johnson offered the tenor another audition and soon awarded him a contract. On January 25, 1945, under the baton of Emil Cooper, Tucker made his debut as Enzo Grimaldo in La Gioconda. This debut, one of the most successful in the annals of the Met, heralded Tucker's 30-year career as the leading American tenor of the Met's postwar era.

Two years after his Metropolitan debut, Tucker was invited to reprise his success in La Gioconda at the amphitheater in Verona, Italy, for which the retired tenor and Verona native, Giovanni Zenatello, had also engaged the young Maria Callas. Two years later, in 1949, Tucker's rapidly ascending career was confirmed when Arturo Toscanini engaged Tucker to sing the role of Radames for the NBC broadcasts of a complete concert performance of Aida opposite Herva Nelli in the title role, an event heard and seen on radio and television, and eventually released on LP, CD, VHS, and DVD. This was one of the first complete opera performances ever broadcast on national television.

In the ensuing years, Tucker's ample lyric voice evolved into a lirico-spinto voice of near-dramatic proportions. If his signature stylistic devices, especially his affection for Italianate sobs, were not always lauded by the critics, the distinctive timbre of his ringing voice, his unfailingly secure technique, impeccable diction, and native-sounding pronunciation were universally acclaimed in every role he undertook. A profusion of legendary tenors – including Jussi Björling, Giuseppe Di Stefano, Mario Del Monaco and, eventually, Jan Peerce) came and went during the years in which (Sir) Rudolf Bing led the Metropolitan. Tucker remained a dominant tenor and steadily took on new challenges. Although an unremarkable actor throughout most of his career, Tucker made a strong dramatic impression with veteran critics when he reconceived the role of Canio in Pagliacci under the direction of Franco Zeffirelli in January 1970. The tenor was nearly 60 years old at the time.

Before and after each Metropolitan Opera season, Tucker appeared on concert stages through the U.S. In the late 1950s and early 1960s, Tucker frequently appeared in a series of well attended open-air concerts at Lewisohn Stadium in New York City, under the direction of Alfredo Antonini.

Throughout his opera career, Tucker maintained a Jewish identity. He kept kosher, and regularly officiated as a cantor on Rosh Hashana, Yom Kippur and other sacred events in the Jewish liturgical calendar, especially in Chicago. He oversaw the religious development of his three sons, Berel (Barry, born 1938); David N. Tucker, M.D. (born 1941); and Henry (born 1946). Their father arranged for them to sing with him on a popular television program hosted by Sam Levenson, 9 March 1952.

Tucker had a long-running contract with Columbia Records, and eventually recorded for RCA Victor as well. But, measured against the sheer length of his career, Tucker's commercial recordings are proportionately sparse and inadequately convey the power and roundness of his voice, according to most of his artistic colleagues. However, his recordings with soprano Leontyne Price (especially in Madama Butterfly and La forza del destino) invariably show him in fine ringing voice and with a convincing dramatic presence. He also made a famous recording of Aida with a colleague from his Verona debut, Maria Callas. He recorded the Verdi Requiem with George London. Many other commercial recordings, as well as private recordings of his concerts and broadcast performances, have been digitally remastered and are available in CD and online downloadable formats. A number of his national television appearances on "The Voice of Firestone" and "The Bell Telephone Hour" were preserved in kinescope and videotape form, and have been reissued in VHS and DVD format. A complete video performance of the tenor's portrayal of Canio in the Zeffirelli production of Pagliacci, which was to be paired with Cavalleria rusticana featuring Tucker's friend and tenor colleague Franco Corelli as Turiddu, was never telecast and has not been issued commercially, for legal reasons.

Although Tucker's well-crafted public image was that of a competitive, overwhelmingly self-confident performer, his offstage demeanor was that of an inherently private but unfailingly considerate man, especially where fans and colleagues were concerned. Never prone to looking back upon his career, Tucker always lived in the moment and maintained a boyish outlook on life. He also displayed a propensity for playing pranks on some of his fellow singers, often provoking a smile at some inappropriate moment in a performance. Once, during a broadcast of La forza del destino with baritone Robert Merrill, Tucker sneaked a nude photograph into a small trunk that Merrill opened onstage. In later years, Merrill described his tenor friend as "an original, right out of the pages of a Damon Runyon story".

Death
[[File:Richard Tucker monument.JPG|thumb|Richard Tucker monument in Lincoln Square, Manhattan {{external media|align=center|width=230px|
|audio1=Tucker with Licia Albanese and Alfredo Antonini at Lewisohn Stadium in 1959 All-Puccini program (1959) Here on WQXR]
|audio2=Tucker sings "Songs From Sunny Italy" with Alfredo Antonini conducting the Columbia Concert Orchestra in 1950 [https://archive.org/details/lp_songs-from-sunny-italy_richard-tucker-alfredo-antonini-columbi/disc1/01.01.+Torna+A+Surriento+(%22Come+Back+To+Sorrento%22).mp3 Here on Archive.org]}}
On January 8, 1975, Tucker died of a sudden heart attack in his dressing room in Kalamazoo, Michigan while on tour with Robert Merrill in a national series of joint concerts. His funeral was held on January 10  on the stage of the Metropolitan Opera House, the only singer ever to be so honored.

 Legacy 
Shortly after his death, the Richard Tucker Music Foundation was established by his widow, sons, colleagues, and friends, "to perpetuate the memory of America's greatest tenor through projects in aid of gifted young singers". In the intervening decades, the Richard Tucker Foundation, whose annual televised concerts have been hosted by Luciano Pavarotti and others, has consistently awarded the largest vocal-music grants and scholarships. Recipients, the first of whom was Rockwell Blake, include sopranos Renée Fleming, Deborah Voigt, tenors Richard Leech, Stephen Costello, James Valenti and other opera singers of international renown.

In tribute to his legacy at the Met, the city of New York designated the park adjacent to Lincoln Center as Richard Tucker Square.

 References Sources' 

 External links 
 .
 Richard Tucker Music Foundation
 Discography (Capon's Lists of Opera Recordings)
 History of the Tenor / Richard Tucker / Sound Clips and Narration
 Richard Tucker Square (NYC Parks Dept)
 
 Richard Tucker in performance on Archive.org

 Audio examples 
 Richard Tucker in La fanciulla del West
 Renata Tebaldi and Richard Tucker in a scene from Puccini's Manon Lescaut
 Richard Tucker in operetta
 , "Vesti la giubba" from Pagliacci, The Ed Sullivan Show December 1969
 , "Un'auro amorosa" from Così fan tutte'' (Mozart), in English ("My love is a flower")

1913 births
1975 deaths
American operatic tenors
Musicians from Brooklyn
Classical musicians from New York (state)
Hazzans
American people of Romanian-Jewish descent
Jewish American classical musicians
Jewish opera singers
20th-century American male opera singers
20th-century American Jews